Carlos Alberto Escudero Lavado (born 11 January 1989) was a Chilean association football. He played as midfielder.

Honours
San Luis de Quillota
 Primera B: 2009 Clausura

Deportes Antofagasta
 Primera B: 2011 Apertura

References
 Profile at BDFA 
 

1989 births
Living people
Chilean footballers
C.D. Antofagasta footballers
San Luis de Quillota footballers
Chilean Primera División players
Primera B de Chile players
Association football forwards
People from Quillota